Andy Saull (born 27 September 1988 in London) is a rugby union player who plays at flanker.

Early life
He was educated at Bancroft's School and Birkbeck, University of London. He formative years were spent playing for Woodford R.F.C. in Redbridge.

Club career
Saull made his debut for Saracens in an EDF Energy Cup match against Bristol.
He made his first Premiership start on 12 September 2008 against Sale Sharks.

He made his full debut for Saracens in 2007–08 season against Bristol in the EDF Energy Cup.
A regular in the team in the 2010/11 title winning season, he was a replacement as Saracens won their first Premiership. However a leg injury prevented him from joining up with England Saxons that summer. Saull made his 100th appearance for Saracens on 27 December 2011, after replacing the injured Jacques Burger in the squad.

On 18 April 2013, Newcastle Falcons signed Saull to a two-year contract from the 2013–14 season. On 17 April 2015, Saull signs for Yorkshire Carnegie, competing in the RFU Championship on a two-year contract from the 2015–16 season. On 13 June 2017, Saull announced his retirement from professional rugby.

International career
Saull was a member of the grand slam winning England Under 20 team in 2008, although he missed much of the season with a broken leg.

Saull made his England Saxons debut against Portugal in January 2009. Winning the Churchill Cup with England Saxons in 2010.

Post career
Saull now researches real estate at Oxford University as part of the Future of Real Estate Initiative after undertaking a Masters in Sustainable Urban Development.

Publications 
Saull, A., and Baum, A. 2019. The Future of Real Estate Transactions. Saïd Business School. https://www.sbs.ox.ac.uk/sites/default/files/2019-03/FoRET-ReportFull.pdf

Baum, A., Saull. A., Braesemann, F. 2020. PropTech 2020: the future of real estate. Saïd Business School. https://www.sbs.ox.ac.uk/sites/default/files/2020-02/proptech2020.pdf

References

External links
Saracens profile
Guinness Premiership profile
England profile

1988 births
Living people
Alumni of Birkbeck, University of London
English rugby union players
People educated at Bancroft's School
Rugby union flankers
Rugby union players from London
Saracens F.C. players